(English: Christmas soda) or  is a Norwegian soft drink, brewed by most Norwegian breweries as a Christmas drink for minors, instead of the traditional  (English: Christmas ale), but is also very popular amongst adults.

Julebrus comes in a sparkly red color, from strawberry and raspberry, or a pale-brown color, similar to beer, depending on brewery and brand.

See also

 Julmust
 List of brand name soft drinks products
 List of soft drink flavors

Norwegian drinks
Christmas food